Crumlin may refer to:

Northern Ireland, UK
 Crumlin, Belfast, a ward of North Belfast
 Crumlin, County Antrim, a village in County Antrim
 Crumlin railway station, Northern Ireland, County Antrim
 Crumlin United F.C., a Northern Irish football club
 Crumlin Road, Belfast

Republic of Ireland
 Crumlin, County Westmeath, a townland in the civil parish of Rathaspick
 Crumlin, Dublin, a suburb of Dublin
 Crumlin GAA, a Gaelic Athletic Association in Dublin

Wales, UK
 Crumlin, Caerphilly, a town in Caerphilly County Borough